Tetraria octandra is a sedge, which is native to the south-west of Western Australia.

Description
Tetraria octandra is a rhizomatous, tufted perennial, sedge which grows from 0.175 to 1.25 m high. Its brown to black flowers may be seen from May to November.  It grows on white, grey or lateritic sand, loam, granite, graveland in swamps and on rocky hillsides.

Distribution
It is found in the  South-West Province of Beard's classification of ecological regions, or using the more recent IBRA region definitions, in
Avon Wheatbelt, Esperance Plains, Geraldton Sandplains, Jarrah Forest, Swan Coastal Plain, and Warren.

Taxonomy
This species was first described by Nees von Esenbeck in 1841 as Elynanthus octandrus. In 1931, Georg Kükenthal reassigned it to the genus, Tetraria.

References

External links
 CYPERACEAE interactive identification keys @ LSU Herbarium

octandra
Plants described in 1841
Taxa named by Georg Kükenthal
Endemic flora of Western Australia